Josef Král (born 15 June 1990 in Dvůr Králové nad Labem) is a professional racing driver from the Czech Republic.

Career

Karting & early career
Král began his motorsport career in karting back in 1998, and during the following seven years he achieved notable success, winning the Czech Republic ICA Junior title in 2003 and the Czech ICA 100 Championship the following year, as well as numerous other titles.

In 2005, Král made his Formula Racing debut, finishing third in the Czech Formula 1400 series.

Formula BMW
In 2006, Král made the step up to Formula BMW, competing in the German ADAC series. Driving for Micánek Motorsport, he scored forty points during the year to be classified in twelfth place. At the end of the year, Král switched to Josef Kaufmann Racing to contest the Formula BMW World Final, held in Valencia. He originally finished as runner-up to team-mate Christian Vietoris, but was subsequently disqualified from the race.

Král continued in Formula BMW for 2007, this time switching to the UK series with Räikkönen Robertson Racing. He scored a total of thirteen podium places in eighteen races, including six wins, to finish as runner-up to Swede Marcus Ericsson. He also took part in two Formula BMW ADAC races, taking a single podium position.

Král once again took part in the end-of-season Formula BMW World Final in Valencia, this time driving for Mücke Motorsport. Again, he finished second on the road behind team-mate Philipp Eng, but was disqualified for a technical infringement.

A1 Grand Prix
In February 2008, Král made his debut for A1 Team Czech Republic in the South African round of the 2007–08 A1 Grand Prix season. After qualifying towards the back of the grid for both races, he finished eighteenth in the sprint race before retiring from the feature event.

International Formula Master
In 2008, Král joined Team JVA to contest the International Formula Master series. He finished the season in sixth place, taking three podium places, including a debut win at Oschersleben.

He remained in the championship for 2009, this time switching to Italian team JD Motorsport. After taking podium places in Valencia, Brno and Brands Hatch, Král won his first race of the season at the Hungaroring, which acted as a support race for the 2009 Hungarian Grand Prix. He added another win at Oschersleben en route to third in the championship.

GP2 Series
In October 2009, Král made his debut in a GP2 car, testing for both Ocean Racing Technology and Piquet GP at Jerez in Spain. Later the same month, he signed with British team Super Nova Racing to contest the 2009–10 GP2 Asia Series. This relationship continued into the main series in 2010, when Král teamed up with his former Formula BMW rival Ericsson. During the sprint race at Valencia, Král's car was launched into the air after he collided with Rodolfo González, before landing heavily and hitting the tyre barriers. Král sustained two fractured vertebrae as a result, and was replaced by Luca Filippi until he recovered. After missing ten races, Král returned to action at the final round of the championship, where he scored his first series points.

Král moved to the Arden International team for 2011, partnered by 2010 FIA Formula Two Championship runner-up Jolyon Palmer. He finished tenth in the Asia series. In the main series, he scored his first podium in the Monaco sprint race. Another podium finish at Spa-Francorchamps saw him improve to 15th place in the championship. He moved to reigning teams' champion, Addax, for the 2012 season, alongside Johnny Cecotto, but was replaced by Dani Clos after the first round of the championship. He then returned to the seat for the fourth round of the series. After a run of pointless weekends, he took his first series victory in the sprint race at Spa-Francorchamps, only to be dropped for the following round of the championship in favour of Jake Rosenzweig. He finished 17th in the championship.

Formula One
Král tested a Formula One car for the first time at the  season-ending "young drivers" test in Abu Dhabi, with Hispania Racing.

Král revealed in June 2013 that he had a contract in place to race in the 2013 Formula One season with HRT F1 before the team went into administration and eventually closed.

Racing record

Career summary

Complete GP2 Series results
(key) (Races in bold indicate pole position) (Races in italics indicate fastest lap)

Complete GP2 Asia Series results
(key) (Races in bold indicate pole position) (Races in italics indicate fastest lap)

Complete GP2 Final results
(key) (Races in bold indicate pole position) (Races in italics indicate fastest lap)

References

External links
 
 
 

1990 births
Living people
People from Dvůr Králové nad Labem
Czech racing drivers
International Formula Master drivers
A1 Team Czech Republic drivers
Formula BMW UK drivers
Formula BMW ADAC drivers
GP2 Asia Series drivers
GP2 Series drivers
Auto GP drivers
24H Series drivers
Super Nova Racing drivers
Arden International drivers
Campos Racing drivers
Sportspeople from the Hradec Králové Region
Josef Kaufmann Racing drivers
JD Motorsport drivers
Mücke Motorsport drivers
Double R Racing drivers
A1 Grand Prix drivers
Charouz Racing System drivers
Ferrari Challenge drivers